Hyocrinidae is a family of echinoderms belonging to the order Hyocrinida.

Genera:
 Ailsacrinus Mironov & Sorokina, 1998
 Anachalypsicrinus AM Clark, 1973
 Belyaevicrinus (Mironov & Sorokina, 1998)
 Calamocrinus Agassiz, 1890
 Camaecrinus Mironov & Sorokina, 1998
 Chambersaecrinus Mironov & Sorokina, 1998
 Dumetocrinus Mironov & Sorokina, 1998
 Feracrinus Mironov & Sorokina, 1998
 Gephyrocrinus Koehler & Bather, 1902
 Hyocrinus Thomson, 1876
 Lamberticrinus Roux, 2017
 Laubiericrinus Roux, 2004
 Parahyocrinus Roux, 2017
 Ptilocrinus Clark, 1907
 Thalassocrinus Clark, 1911
 Tiburonicrinus Roux, 2017

References

Hyocrinida
Echinoderm families